Nikolaos Argyriou (born 4 April 1994) is a Greek footballer who plays for AO Thiva , as a defender.

Honours
AEK Athens
Football League 2: 1
 2014(6th Group)

External links
 
 superleaguegreece.net
 nikivoloufc.gr

1994 births
Living people
Super League Greece players
AEK Athens F.C. players
Niki Volos F.C. players
Association football fullbacks
Footballers from Athens
Greek footballers